Zuras is a fictional character appearing in American comic books published by Marvel Comics. The character is depicted as a member of the Eternals who is the uncle of Thanos and Starfox.

Publication history
Zuras first appeared in The Eternals #5 (November 1976), and was created by Jack Kirby.

Marvel Comics continuity was later retconned so that the character presented as the mythological god Jupiter, introduced in Red Raven Comics #1 (August 1940), was, in fact, Zuras.

Fictional character biography
Zuras was born in Titanos, the first city of the Eternals, and is the son of the Eternals Kronos and Daina, and brother of A'Lars (Mentor). With his wife Cybele, he has a daughter Thena and is also the uncle of Thanos and Starfox and the nephew of Uranos.

Zuras was a warrior and vied with his brother A'lars (whom he exiled into space) for leadership of the Eternals of Titanos following Kronos' death. Zuras was the first Eternal to form a Uni-Mind by creating the first ritual of the Uni-Mind, and was therefore chosen to become the leader of the Eternals of Earth. He was mistaken for the Greek god Zeus many times in the past, and ultimately forged a pact with Zeus to keep their people at peace.  When Kro spread chaos in the 1940s, Zuras sent Makkari to oppose him. He also forced the Forgotten One into exile, stripped him of his name, and forbade the Eternals from communicating with him. Zuras appears to have been well-traveled, since his quarters in Olympia were decorated with a jukebox, two six-shooters and battle-axes.

Zuras authorized Thena to resume her battles against the Deviants, and ordered her and Makkari to battle against Zakka in New York. He also aided Mr. Bradford, a government agent, in studying the Celestials.  Zuras attempted to mind-probe the Celestial craft, and learned of the coming of the Fourth Celestial Host. He initiated the first Uni-Mind fusion of Eternals in modern times to attempt to communicate with Arishem. He ended the Uni-Mind fusion, and traveled to New York City and addressed the public on the subject of the Celestial host on a television broadcast. He explored the tomb of Dromedan the Brain-Snatcher, and battled Dromedan. He then assisted the U.S. State Department in the investigation of the Celestial threat.

Zuras later encountered Thor. Zuras initiated a second Uni-Mind fusion to engage the Celestial mothership, but this was interrupted by Odin and Zeus to prevent the Eternals from interfering in a pact the gods had made with the Celestials. Zuras briefly battled Zeus. Zuras then allied himself with Odin and initiated the third Uni-Mind to combat the Fourth Host of Celestials in Peru. While fused with the Eternals in the Uni-Mind formation, Zuras attacked the Fourth Celestial host. The Uni-Mind was blown apart by a cosmic blast from the Celestials Gammenon and Jemiah, causing it to disintegrate into its component Eternals, and the backlash caused Zuras's brain death. Even then, Zuras' spirit continued to exist within his body, until his body was finally destroyed by freeing Thena from a Brain-Mine, at which point Zuras's spirit left his body. Zuras's spirit still seems to exist, as it has appeared at times within Olympia, such as when Ikaris challenged Thena for the title of Prime Eternal.

Reborn
Sprite stated that he used the pieces of machinery of Olympia to partially "reactivate" Zuras—and then deceived Zuras into visiting the tomb of the Dreaming Celestial, forming a Uni-Mind there. This provided Sprite with the power he needed to rewrite some aspects of reality, stripping the other Eternals of their powers and memories. Sprite also stated that he considered Zuras to be the most powerful of the Eternals.

In the "rewritten" world, Zuras was made into an alcoholic homeless man, with mental problems.  He was, however, restored by Ajak. Ultimately, Zuras found Sprite after the events were resolved, and killed him by snapping Sprite's neck.

Later when the Celestials' Final Host arrived on Earth, Zuras along with all the Eternals killed themselves after realizing the true purpose for which they were created.

Powers and abilities
Zuras has achieved above-average development of the normal attributes of the race of Eternals through great discipline. He possesses superhuman strength, speed, stamina, and durability, and can fly at supersonic speeds. Zuras possesses the ability to manipulate cosmic energy to augment his life force granting him great longevity and regenerative abilities, the projection of concussive force, heat, and electrical energy up to a maximum range of 300 feet. He could also use cosmic energy to create force shields around himself, to levitate himself and/or others, and to psionically manipulate molecules to transform an object's shape. During his lifetime, Zuras was the only Eternal known capable of initiating the creation of the Uni-Mind (the collective life-form resulting from the physical and mental merging of a significant number of Eternals) by himself. Zuras is also capable of telepathy, illusion-casting, and limited teleportation.

Zuras possesses extensive knowledge of ancient and arcane wisdom.

Reception
 In 2021, CBR.com ranked Zuras 11th in their "15 Most Powerful Eternals" list.
 In 2021, Screen Rant ranked Zuras 7th in their "10 Most Powerful Members Of The Eternals" list
 In 2021, CBR.com ranked Zuras 3rd in their "10 Strongest Characters From Eternals Comics" list.

References

External links
 Zuras at the Marvel Universe
 Zuras at the Marvel Directory
 Zuras at the Marvel Database
 Zuras at ImmortalThor.net

Characters created by Jack Kirby
Comics characters introduced in 1976
Eternals (comics)
Fictional characters with superhuman durability or invulnerability
Fictional genetically engineered characters
Fictional kings
Marvel Comics characters who can move at superhuman speeds
Marvel Comics characters who can teleport
Marvel Comics characters with accelerated healing
Marvel Comics characters with superhuman strength
Marvel Comics telepaths